Transit is a 2013 Filipino independent drama film written and directed by Hannah Espia. The film follows a story about a single father who is forced to hide his children from immigration police in Israel after the Israeli government decides to deport children of immigrant workers. It is Espia's full-length debut film. It was mostly shot in Israel. The film competed under the New Breed section of Cinemalaya 2013. The film won Best Film, directing, acting and other technical awards.

Espia said that the inspiration to do the film came after talking to an OFW who was bringing home his child from Israel. In 2009, the Israeli government enacted a law that deports the children of migrant workers unless they fulfill a certain criterion. Both Israeli and migrant workers rallied against the law that separates parents from their children. 

The film competed in the 18th Busan International Film Festival in the "New Currents" section. The film was selected as the Philippine entry for the Best Foreign Language Film at the 86th Academy Awards, but it was not nominated.

Plot
The film begins and ends in an airport during a father and son's transit flight from Tel Aviv to Manila. It tells the story of Moises (Ping Medina), a Filipino single-dad working as a caregiver in Herzliya, Israel, who comes home to his apartment in Tel Aviv to celebrate his son Joshua (Marc Justine Alvarez)’s 4th birthday. It was on that day that Moises, together with their Filipino neighbors Janet (Irma Adlawan), and her daughter Yael (Jasmine Curtis), find out that the Israeli government is going to deport children of foreign workers. Afraid of the new law, Moises and Janet decide to hide their children from the immigration police by making them stay inside the house.

Cast
Ping Medina as Moises
Irma Adlawan as Janet
Jasmine Curtis-Smith as Yael
Marc Justine Alvarez as Joshua
Mercedes Cabral as Tina
Perla (Pnina) Bronstein as Rotem
Omer Juran as Omri
Toni Gonzaga as Joshua's Mother
Menahem Godick as Israeli policeman

Awards
2013 Cinemalaya Film Festival (New Breed)
 Best Film
 Audience Award
 Best Director – Hannah Espia
 Best Actress – Irma Adlawan
 Best Supporting Actress – Jasmine Curtis-Smith
 Special Jury Citation for Best Acting Ensemble – (Irma Adlawan, Marc Alvarez, Mercedes Cabral, Jasmine Curtis, Ping Medina)
 Best Cinematography – Ber Cruz and Lyle Nemenzo Sacris
 Best Editing –  Benjamin Tolentino and Hannah Espia
 Best Score – Mon Espia
2014 Gawad Urian Awards
 Best Director – Hannah Espia

References

External links
 

2013 films
2013 drama films
Philippine independent films
Philippine New Wave
Philippine drama films
2013 independent films